The 20K run (20 kilometres, or approximately 12.4 miles) is a long distance foot race. It is a rarely held race that is not recognized as an Olympic event. The event held IAAF world championship status in 2006 only, when the existing IAAF World Half Marathon Championships briefly hosted the shorter distance.

The world best for men is held by Zersenay Tadese of Eritrea who ran a time of 56:01 at the 2006 IAAF World Road Running Championships in Debrecen, Hungary. The women's world best is held by Florence Kiplagat of Kenya who ran a time of 1:01:54 at the 2015 Barcelona Half Marathon in Barcelona, Spain. IAAF records require the 20 km distance to be run on a course without a significant drop in elevation between the start and finish points and where the birds-eye distance between the start of finish points is less than ten kilometres. The Association of Road Racing Statisticians has an additional criteria in that it requires records to be set in competitions of the given distance, thus it does not recognise Kiplagat's run due to it being recorded en route to a longer distance. The ARRS-recognised world record is 1:03:21 by Lornah Kiplagat of the Netherlands, who also recorded her time at the 2006 World Championships.

Road races

There are several annual road running competitions over the 20 km distance, mostly based in Western Europe, the United States, and Japan.

Europe
 20 van Alphen
 20 km of Brussels
 20 Kilomètres de Paris
 20 km of Tours
 20 km of Lausanne
 20 km of Maroilles
 Behobia-San Sebastián
 Friedeslauf 20 km
 Marseille-Cassis Classique Internationale
 Zilveren Molenloop

Japan
 Hakone Ekiden Yosenkai
 Takashimadaira 20 km

United States
 New Haven Road Race
 John F Kennedy Memorial 20 km
 Vestal XX
 Penn Relays 20 km

The Kanaguri Hai Tamana Half Marathon, Dam to Dam Half Marathon and Ogden Newspapers Classic Half Marathon were all previously 20 km races for much of their history.

All-time top 25
+ = en route to longer performance
Mx = mixed gender race
Wo = women only race

Men
Correct as of October 2022

Notes
Below is a list of other times equal or superior to 55:47:
Jacob Kiplimo also ran 54:42 (2020), 54:53 (2022).
Rhonex Kipruto also ran 55:04 (2021).
Kibiwott Kandie also ran 55:08 (2022).
Philemon Kiplimo also ran 55:19 (2021).
Alexander Mutiso also ran 55:41 (2022).
Kelvin Kiptum also ran 55:45 (2021).
Abadi Hadis also ran 55:46 (2019).

Women
Updated March 2023

Notes
Below is a list of other times equal or superior to 1:02:20:
Yalemzerf Yehualaw also ran 1:01:05  (2021), 1:02:04  (2020).
Hellen Obiri also ran 1:01:18  (2021).
Joyciline Jepkosgei also ran 1:01:25  (2017), 1:01.28 (2017).
Sheila Chepkirui also ran 1:01:26  (2021).
Brigid Kosgei also ran 1:01:29 (2020).
Ruth Chepngetich also ran 1:02:10 (2022).
Sheila Chepkirui also ran 1:02:15  (2020).
Ababel Yeshaneh also ran 1:02:17 (2020).

Notes

References

 
Road running distances
Long-distance running distances